USS Monticello may refer to the following ships of the United States Navy:

, was a wooden screw steamer launched in 1859, purchased in 1861, sold in 1865; foundered while in merchant service in 1872
, was built in 1928 as SS Conte Grande purchased by the US Navy and commissioned, 1942; decommissioned, 1946; returned to Italy in 1947
, was a  commissioned in 1957 and decommissioned in 1985

United States Navy ship names